The Hérault is a river in southern France. Its source is on the slopes of Mont Aigoual in the Cévennes mountains. It reaches the Mediterranean Sea near Agde.

Name
The river was known in Latin as Arauris (or Araura by Strabo). The name is sometimes considered Pre-Celtic although the element Ara- suggests a Celtic root.

Towns

The Hérault flows through the following departments and towns:
Gard: Valleraugue.
Hérault (named after the river): Ganges, Pézenas (nearby), Agde.

Tributaries

Navigation
The lower reaches of the Hérault, from Bessan to the sea at Agde, are navigable. The lowest  are tidal, whilst the next  forms part of the Canal du Midi. These two sections of the river are linked to each other, and to the Canal du Midi to the west, by short junction canals and the famous Agde Round Lock.

At the upper end of the section of the Hérault used by the Canal du Midi, the Prades Lock provides access to the Canal du Midi to the east. Above this lock, the river is navigable for a further  or so.

References

Rivers of France
Rivers of Occitania (administrative region)
Rivers of Gard
Rivers of Hérault
0Herault